Božejov is a market town in Pelhřimov District in the Vysočina Region of the Czech Republic. It has about 600 inhabitants.

Administrative parts
The village of Nová Ves is an administrative part of Božejov.

Notable people
Lukáš Masopust (born 1993), footballer

References

Populated places in Pelhřimov District
Market towns in the Czech Republic